The Institut d'administration des entreprises de Paris (also known as IAE Paris or Sorbonne Business School) is a public business school, part of University of Paris 1 Pantheon-Sorbonne in Paris,  France. It is also a component of the IAE's network, bringing together 33 national business schools around France.
With its historical reputations, the school is known as one of the most prestigious business schools in France and has many important graduates in various fields.

History
The Institut d'Administration des Entreprises de Paris was established in 1956 by Gaston Berger and Robert Goetz. The IAE de Paris is public business school attached to the University of Paris 1 Pantheon-Sorbonne, one of the world's oldest universities.
The vocation of the school is to provide skills in Management and Business Administration to executives and students from various backgrounds (in engineering, law, humanities...)  and to offer advanced expertise to high potential professionals who are seeking executive responsibilities.

Admissions

Students are selectively recruited after a bachelor's or master's degree from Public Universities, Grandes Ecoles, Grands Etablissements or equivalents.
Candidates need to show very good academic records, pass an entrance examination, and show working knowledge of French language, as well as English proficiency for many courses.

Academics
The IAE de Paris educates more than 1500 students every year in the fields of Business Administration and Management.

PhD Degrees

Doctorate Program in Management (with HEC and ENSAM/ESTP)

Research reception team
GREGOR
GREGHEC
GRID

Master's Degrees

Alumni Network

The IAE de Paris alumni network has 22,500+ members all around the world and plays a central role in the promotion of the French IAE network.
The IAE de Paris Alumni Association is a member of the G16+ a network regrouping the most prestigious French Engineering schools (Ecole Polytechnique, ENPC, Ecole Centrale Paris, ENSMP...) and Business schools (INSEAD, ESSEC, HEC, ...).

Rankings
MBA from IAE Paris is ranked 36th and 5th European French behind INSEAD, HEC Paris, ESSEC and the EDHEC MBA in TOP QS ranking.
     
Master Marketing and Commercial Practices of IAE Paris is considered as one of the top Masters in Marketing with those of HEC, ESSEC and ESCP according to the magazine Challenge.
The Executive Master in Human Resources Management is in the Top 3 with ENSAM – ENS Cachan and Dauphine for social connections 2012.
International MBA in the top 20 Executive MBA French 201330.

Two master programs have been regularly ranked best masters in Europe in the SMBG ranking :
 The Master in General Management (AEM)
 The Master Marketing and Commercial practices

External links
Sorbonne Business School – Institut d'Administration des Entreprises de Paris
IAE de Paris Alumni
Université Paris 1 Panthéon Sorbonne

Paris
Postgraduate schools in France
Schools in Paris
Universities in Paris
Educational institutions established in 1956
1956 establishments in France